Nyoni is a ward in Mbinga District the Ruvuma Region of the Tanzanian Southern Highlands. It is located along the A19 road.

In 2016 the Tanzania National Bureau of Statistics report there were 11,885 people in the ward, from 10,918 in 2012.

References

Populated places in Iringa Region